Leidulv is a Norwegian given name. Notable people with the name include:

Leidulv Namtvedt (born 1950), Norwegian diplomat
Leidulv Risan (born 1948), Norwegian screenwriter, film director, and professor 

Norwegian masculine given names